Takaku Fuke (冨宅飛駈; January 30, 1969), born Yusuke Fuke (冨宅裕介) is a Japanese professional wrestler and former mixed martial arts fighter. He was most notably involved in the early days of Pancrase, at infancy of Mixed Martial Arts in Japan. Fight Matrix ranked Takaku Fuke was #2 Heavyweight and #4 Pound-for-Pound best MMA fighter in the world in 1994.

Background
Fuke was an active practitioner of judo in high school. After graduating from high school in 1989, he became a UWF trainee. There, he would train with likes of Tatsuo Nakano and Ken Shamrock. Subsequently, he would work for Pro Wrestling Fujiwara Gumi. While employed with PWFG, he was involved in a proto-MMA match with kickboxer Lawi Napataya.

Combat sport career 
At Pancrase 2  (October 1993), he lost to Bas Rutten via TKO, following a knee to Fuke's liver. In November 1993, Fuke lost to Ken Shamrock via submission.  In December 1994, Fuke took part in the King of Pancrase Tournament, where he lost against Maurice Smith in the first round. At Pancrase 19, Fuke lost to Frank Shamrock.

In June 2003, he transferred to the new section "Pancrase MISSION" in Pancrase from "Pancrase Osaka.". He became a player belonging to MISSION next to Minoru Suzuki, and in the same month, participated in "U-STYLE" for the first time.

On November 7, 2014 at WRESTLE-1/ZERO-ONE KASSEN ~ Battle ZERO1 Vs. W-1 Tournament - Day 3, he worked a match with his old Pancrase alumni, Masakatsu Funaki.  In February 2019, at WRESTLE-1 Keiji Muto Produce Pro-Wrestling Masters event, Fuke took part in a 6-man tag team match, teamed up with Mitsuya Nagai and Yoshiaki Fujiwara, against Jushin Thunder Liger, Riki Choshu and Tatsumi Fujinami.

Movie appearances 
 Dynamite Wolf (February 16, 2019) - as himself

Mixed martial arts record

| Loss
| align=center| 
| Yuji Hoshino
| Decision (unanimous)
| Pancrase 116
| 
| align=center| 2
| align=center| 5:00
| Osaka, Japan
|  
|-

| Loss
| align=center| 
| Kenichi Serizawa
| Loss (Triangle Arm-Bar)
| Pancrase 110
| 
| align=center| 2
| align=center| 2:41
| Osaka, Japan
| 

|-
| Draw
| align=center| 
| Manao Kumagai
| Draw
| Japan Regional
| 
| align=center| ?
| align=center| ?
| Unknown
|
|-
| Loss
| align=center| 
| Hikaru Sato
| Decision (majority)
| Pancrase 106
| 
| align=center| 2
| align=center| 5:00
| Osaka, Japan
|  
|-

| Loss
| align=center| 
| Kenji Arai
| Injury
| Pancrase 104
| 
| align=center| 1
| align=center| 3:28
| Osaka, Japan
| 
|-

| Loss
| align=center| 
| Ryo Chonan
| Decision (Unanimous)
| Deep 3: Impact
| 
| align=center| 3
| align=center| 5:00
| Osaka, Japan
| 
|-

| Loss
| align=center| 
| Kazuo Misaki
| TKO (Punches)
| Pancrase 101
| 
| align=center| 1
| align=center| 0:08
| Osaka, Japan, Japan
| 
|-

| Loss
| align=center| 
| Minoru Suzuki
| Submission (Kneebar)
| Pancrase 100
| 
| align=center| 1
| align=center| 5:09
| Osaka, Japan
| 
|-

| Draw
| align=center| 
| Daisuke Watanabe
| Decision (majority)
| Pancrase 83
| 
| align=center| 2
| align=center| 3:00
| Yokohama, Japan
| 
|-

| Win
| align=center| 
| Minoru Suzuki
| Decision (points)
| Pancrase 59
| 
| align=center| 2
| align=center| 3:00
| Kobe, Japan
| 
|-
| Draw
| align=center| 
| Tony Rojo
| Decision (majority)
| Pancrase 58
| 
| align=center| 2
| align=center| 3:00
| 
| 
|-

| Loss
| align=center| 
| Osami Shibuya
| Decision (unanimous)
| Pancrase 56
| 
| align=center| 2
| align=center| 3:00
| 
|  
|-

| Draw
| align=center| 
| Katsuomi Inagaki
| Decision (majority)
| Pancrase 54
| 
| align=center| 2
| align=center| 
| 
| 
|-

| Loss
| align=center| 
| Takafumi Ito
| Decision (unanimous)
| Pancrase 53
| 
| align=center| 1
| align=center| 5:52
| 
|  
|-

| Loss
| align=center| 
| Satoshi Hasegawa
| Decision (points)
| Pancrase 50
| 
| align=center| 2
| align=center| 
| 
|  
|-

| Loss
| align=center| 
| Takafumi Ito
| Submisison (armbar)
| Pancrase 48
| 
| align=center| 1
| align=center| 5:52
| 
| 
|-

| Win
| align=center| 
| Kosei Kubota
| Submission (guillotine choke)
| Pancrase 47
| 
| align=center| 1
| align=center| 3:22
| 
|  
|-

| Loss
| align=center| 
| Bas Rutten
| Submission (armbar)
| Pancrase 44
| 
| align=center| 1
| align=center| 4:28
| 
| 
|-

| Loss
| align=center| 
| Semmy Schilt
| Submission (rear naked choke)
| Pancrase 42
| 
| align=center| 1
| align=center| 8:59
| 
| 
|-

| Win
| align=center| 
| Paul Lazenby
| Submission (anklelock)
| Pancrase 41
| 
| align=center| 1
| align=center| 7:45
| 
| 
|-

| Win
| align=center| 
| Haygar Chin
| Submission (3:46)
| Pancrase 39
| 
| align=center| 1
| align=center| 3:46
| 
| 
|-

| Loss
| align=center| 
| Osami Shibuya
| Decision (points)
| Pancrase 38
| 
| align=center| 1
| align=center| 15
| 
| 
|-

| Win
| align=center| 
| Jong Wang Kim
| Submission (rear naked choke)
| Pancrase 37
| 
| align=center| 1
| align=center| 2:09
| 
| 
|-

| Loss
| align=center| 
| Ryushi Yanagisawa
| Decision (points)
| Pancrase 30
| 
| align=center| 1
| align=center| 15:00
| 
| 
|-

| Draw
| align=center| 
| Vernon White
| Draw (unanimous)
| Pancrase 29
| 
| align=center| 1
| align=center| 10:00
| 
|  
|-

| Loss
| align=center| 
| Guy Mezger
| Decision (unanimous)
| Pancrase 27
| 
| align=center| 1
| align=center| 10:00
| 
| 
|-

| Loss
| align=center| 
| Minoru Suzuki
| Submission (arm bar)
| Pancrase 26: Truth 2
| 
| align=center|1
| align=center| 4:15
| Kobe, Japan
| 
|-

| Win
| align=center| 
| Leon Van Dijk
| Decision (points)
| Pancrase 25
| 
| align=center| 1
| align=center| 10:00
| 
|  
|-

| Loss
| align=center| 
| Masakatsu Funaki
| Submission (rear naked choke)
| Pancrase 24
| 
| align=center| 1
| align=center| 0:31
| 
| 
|-

| Loss
| align=center| 
| Jason DeLucia
| Decision (points)
| Pancrase 23
| 
| align=center| 1
| align=center| 30:00
| 
|  
|-

| Win
| align=center| 
| Todd Medina
| Submission (armbar)
| Pancrase 22
| 
| align=center| 1
| align=center| 5:30
| 
| 
|-

| Loss
| align=center| 
| Frank Shamrock
| Submission (rear naked choke)
| Pancrase 19
| 
| align=center| 1
| align=center| 8:16
| 
| 
|-

| Win
| align=center| 
| Gregory Smit
| Decision (points)
| Pancrase 18
| 
| align=center| 1
| align=center| 20:00
| 
|  
|-

| Loss
| align=center| 
| Bas Rutten
| Submission (heel hook)
| Pancrase 17
| 
| align=center| 1
| align=center| 1:52
| 
|  
|-

| Loss
| align=center| 
| Larry Papadopoulos
| Decision (unanimous)
| Pancrase 16
| 
| align=center| 1
| align=center| 15:00
| 
| 
|-

| Win
| align=center| 
| Richard Saar
| TKO (spinning backfist)
| Pancrase 15
| 
| align=center| 1
| align=center| 0:23
| 
|  
|-

| Loss
| align=center| 
| Maurice Smith
| TKO (Knee)
| Pancrase 13
| 
| align=center| 1
| align=center| 2:48
| 
|  
|-

| Loss
| align=center| 
| Ken Shamrock
| Submission (rear naked choke)
| Pancrase 12
| 
| align=center| 1
| align=center| 3:13
| 
|  
|-

| Win
| align=center| 
| Manabu Yamada
| Submission (heel hook)
| Pancrase 11
| 
| align=center| 1
| align=center| 13:47
| 
| 
|-

| Win
| align=center| 
| Jason Delucia
| Submission (heel hook)
| Pancrase 10
| 
| align=center| 1
| align=center| 4:00
| Tokyo, Japan
| 
|-

| Win
| align=center| 
| Gregory Smit
| Submission (ankle lock)
| Pancrase 9
| 
| align=center| 1
| align=center| 3:46
| 
| 
|-

| Win
| align=center| 
| Toon Stelling
| Disqualification (Illegal soccer kick)
| Pancrase 8
| 
| align=center| 1
| align=center| 4:37
| 
| 
|-
| Loss
| align=center| 
| Masakatsu Funaki
| Submission (rear naked choke)
| Pancrase 7
| 
| align=center| 1
| align=center| 6:55
| 
| 
|-
| Loss
| align=center| 
| Minoru Suzuki
| Submission (rear naked choke)
| Pancrase 6: Pancrash! 2
| 
| align=center| 1
| align=center| 6:31
| Aichi, Japan
| 
|-
| Win
| align=center| 
| Scott Bessac
| Submission(heel hook)
| Pancrase 5: Pancrash! 1
| 
| align=center| 1
| align=center| 3:04
| 
| 
|-
| Win
| align=center| 
| Katsuomi Inagaki
| Submission (rear naked choke)
| Pancrase 4
| 
| align=center| 1
| align=center| 6:18
| Hakata, Japan
| 
|-
| Loss
| align=center| 
| Ken Shamrock
| Submission (rear naked choke)
| Pancrase 3
| 
| align=center| 1
| align=center| 0:44
| Kobe, Japan
| 
|-
| Loss
| align=center| 
| Bas Rutten
| TKO (knee to the body)
| Pancrase 2
| 
| align=center| 1
| align=center| 2:03
| Nagoya, Japan
| 
|-
| Win
| align=center| 
| Vernon White
| Submission (armbar)
| Pancrase 1
| 
| align=center| 1
| align=center| 1:19
| Tokyo, Japan
| 
|-

References

External links
 Takaku Fuke on Fight Matrix
 

Living people
People from Osaka Prefecture
Sportspeople from Osaka Prefecture
People from Sakai, Osaka
1969 births
Japanese male professional wrestlers
Japanese male mixed martial artists
Light heavyweight mixed martial artists
Mixed martial artists utilizing shoot wrestling
Mixed martial artists utilizing judo
Mixed martial artists utilizing kickboxing